Cinctipora elegans is a bryozoan species in the genus Cinctipora found in shallow sea-bed around New Zealand. Fossils of the species are also known.

References

External links
 Cinctipora elegans on www.eol.org
 Cinctipora elegans on www.nhm.ac.uk

Cyclostomatida
Animals described in 1873